Wake Up and Die (Italian: Svegliati e uccidi), also known as Wake Up and Kill and I Kill for Kicks, is a 1966 Italian crime drama film directed by Carlo Lizzani, based on the real life of Luciano Lutring, an Italian criminal known as "the machine-gun soloist" ("il solista del mitra").

For this film Lisa Gastoni was awarded with a Silver Ribbon for Best Actress.

Cast 
Robert Hoffmann as  Luciano Lutring
Lisa Gastoni as Yvonne Lutring
Gian Maria Volonté as Inspector Moroni
Claudio Camaso as Franco Magni
Ottavio Fanfani as Inspector Julien
Corrado Olmi as Bobino

References

External links

Cultural depictions of Italian men

1966 films
Films scored by Ennio Morricone
Films directed by Carlo Lizzani
Italian gangster films
Italian crime drama films
Italian biographical drama films
Biographical films about criminals
Films with screenplays by Ugo Pirro
1966 crime drama films
1960s Italian-language films
1960s Italian films